Robert Arbuckle Berner  (November 25, 1935 – January 10, 2015) was an American scientist known for his contributions to the modeling of the carbon cycle. He taught Geology and Geophysics from 1965 to 2007 at Yale University, where he latterly served as Professor Emeritus until his death. His work on sedimentary rocks led to the co-founding of the BLAG model of atmospheric carbon dioxide, which takes into account both geochemical and biological contributions to the carbon cycle.

Early life
Berner was born on November 25, 1935 in Erie, Pennsylvania to Paul Nau Berner and Priscilla (Arbuckle) Berner. He was encouraged to develop an interest in geology by his older brother (and now deceased geologist) Paul. Bob initially attended Purdue University but soon  transferred to the University of Michigan, where he earned his bachelor's degree in 1958 and his master's degree in 1959. Next he attended Harvard University where in 1962 he earned his Ph.D. in Geology.

Academic career and research
In 1962, Berner won a fellowship to do research at the Scripps Institute of Oceanography in San Diego, California. From 1963 until 1965, he worked as an assistant professor at the University of Chicago. Beginning in 1965, he taught at Yale University where he became the Alan M. Bateman Professor in 1987, a position he held until his retirement in 2007.

Berner's early research focused on the application of chemical thermodynamics and kinetics on sediments and sedimentary rocks. Results from these experiments led to his 1971 book Principles of Chemical Sedimentology. In 1980, Berner authored Early Diagenesis: A Theoretical Approach which was quoted so often that the Institute for Scientific Information declared it a Science Citation Classic. Noting the role that sedimentary rocks at or near the Earth's surface play in the carbon cycle, Berner, along with Tony Lasaga, and Bob Garrels put forth the BLAG model of the carbon cycle in 1983 (BLAG from the letters of their last names). BLAG attempts to model variations of atmospheric carbon dioxide back through geologic time to the Cretaceous using both Geochemical and Biological carbon cycles. Berner subsequently extended this idea with the GEOCARB model, which attempts to model such variations back to the Phanerozoic. Berner's later research focused on computer modeling of carbon and sulfur cycles, as well as the effects of atmospheric carbon dioxide and oxygen on the paleoclimate.

Personal life
In 1959, Berner married fellow Geology graduate student Elizabeth Marshall Kay. They have three children, and coauthored a book together in 1995, Global Environment: Water, Air, and Geochemical Cycles. Berner's father-in-law, Professor Marshall Kay was a well-known academic geologist as well.

Berner died on January 10, 2015, following a long illness.

Awards and honors
Member of the National Academy of Sciences
Most-cited Scientist, Institute for Science Information 
Sverdrup Postdoctoral Fellow, Scripps Institute of Oceanography, 1962-1963
Alfred P. Sloan Research Fellowship in Chemistry, Alfred P. Sloan Foundation, 1968
Mineralogical Society of America Award, 1971
Guggenheim Fellow in Earth Science, John Simon Guggenheim Memorial Foundation, 1972
Doctor Honoris Causa, Université Aix-Marseille III, 1991
A.G. Huntsman Award for Excellence in the Marine Sciences, 1993
V. M. Goldschmidt Medal, The Geochemical Society, 1995
Murchison Medal, Geological Society of London, 1996
Arthur L. Day Medal, Geological Society of America, 1996
Bownocker Medal, Ohio State University 2001
Vernadsky Medal, International Association of GeoChemistry, 2012
Benjamin Franklin Medal in Earth and Environmental Science, Franklin Institute, 2013

References 

1935 births
2015 deaths
American geologists
University of Michigan alumni
Harvard Graduate School of Arts and Sciences alumni
Yale University faculty
Sloan Research Fellows
Presidents of the Geochemical Society
Recipients of the V. M. Goldschmidt Award